Fiaz is a surname. Notable people with the surname include:

Muhammad Fiaz, Canadian politician
Rokhsana Fiaz (born 1971), British politician

See also
Faiz